Tindivanam was a Lok Sabha (Parliament of India) constituency in Tamil Nadu. After delimitation in 2009, it is defunct.

Assembly segments
Tindivanam Lok Sabha constituency was composed of the following assembly segments:
Tindivanam (moved to Viluppuram constituency after 2009)
Vanur (SC) (moved to Viluppuram constituency after 2009)
Kandamangalam (SC)
Villupuram (moved to Viluppuram constituency after 2009)
Mugaiyur
Thirunavalur

Members of the Parliament

Election results

General Election 2004

General Election 1999

General Election 1998

General Election 1996

General Election 1991

General Election 1989

General Election 1984

General Election 1980

General Election 1977

General Election 1971

General Election 1967

General Election 1962

General Election 1957

General Election 1952

References

 Election Commission of India -http://www.eci.gov.in/StatisticalReports/ElectionStatistics.asp

See also
 Tindivanam
 List of Constituencies of the Lok Sabha

Viluppuram district
Former Lok Sabha constituencies of Tamil Nadu
Former constituencies of the Lok Sabha
2008 disestablishments in India
Constituencies disestablished in 2008